Southwestern Bell Telephone Company is a wholly owned subsidiary of AT&T. It does business as other d.b.a. names in its operating region, which includes Arkansas, Kansas, Missouri, Oklahoma, Texas, and portions of Illinois.

The company is currently headquartered in Dallas, Texas at One AT&T Plaza.

History 

Southwestern Bell Telephone traces its roots to The Missouri and Kansas Telephone Company, which was founded in 1882. It was consolidated under a single management unit of the Bell System with Southwestern Telegraph and Telephone Company of Texas-Arkansas, Pioneer Telephone and Telegraph Company of Oklahoma, and The Bell Telephone Company of Missouri—also called The Missouri Bell Telephone Company—on March 1, 1912. These companies comprised the "Southwestern System" of the Bell System. The latter three companies were legally merged into Missouri and Kansas Telephone Company in 1917, which was renamed Southwestern Bell Telephone Company.

The company was often considered the first step of the AT&T corporate "ladder" before the 1984 breakup of that company. While part of the Bell System, it was at times the biggest Bell Operating Company of AT&T's 22 local telephone companies.

Southwestern Bell continued to grow in size when it absorbed several smaller telephone companies. In 1950, the company absorbed the operations of Southeast Missouri Telephone Company, which had been formerly named Cape Girardeau Bell Telephone Company. In 1952, the company absorbed the operations of the Southwest Telephone Company, which served Kansas, Missouri, and Oklahoma. In 1953, it absorbed the Ozark Central Telephone Company

Southwestern Bell also provides service to Kaskaskia and McClure, Illinois.

Southwestern Bell Corporation

On January 1, 1984, as part of the breakup of AT&T, Southwestern Bell Telephone became the namesake and leading subsidiary of the new Regional Bell Operating Company, Southwestern Bell Corporation. SBC was the smallest of all of the seven "Baby Bells", as it only held one telephone company. The architect of divestiture for Southwestern Bell was Robert G. Pope. He later became the Vice-Chairman of the board of directors and Chief Financial Officer of SBC while remaining the President and CEO of the several subsidiaries.

Although "Southwestern Bell" generally referred to the operations of the entire Baby Bell, in 1995, SBC decided to change its corporate name to SBC Communications in order to reposition itself as a national telecommunications company. Southwestern Bell Telephone underwent a branding overhaul and adopted the slogan, "Your friendly neighborhood global telecommunications company." The slogan was later shortened to, "Friendly. Neighborhood. Global."

Reincorporation

On December 30, 2001, the original Southwestern Bell Telephone Company, incorporated in Missouri, ceased to exist when it was merged into Southwestern Bell Texas, Inc., a separate operating company incorporated in Texas. Southwestern Bell Texas then converted itself into a limited partnership and renamed itself Southwestern Bell Telephone, L.P., incorporated in Texas. This company ceased to exist on June 29, 2007, when it was merged into SWBT Inc., incorporated in Missouri, which was founded just 8 days prior. At that point, SWBT Inc. took the formerly dormant name Southwestern Bell Telephone Company and Southwestern Bell again became a resident company in Missouri.

In 2012, Southwestern Bell relocated its state of incorporation from Missouri to Delaware.

Branding

From its name change in 1917 until 2001, SWBT was simply branded as Southwestern Bell. Starting in 1999, SBC Communications began branding its operating companies as part of the "SBC Global Network," with the name enclosed in a circle with the Pacific Telesis "access" mark to the logos of its divisions (Ameritech, Nevada Bell, Pacific Bell, SNET, Southwestern Bell).

In 2000, the Bell logo was dropped from the mark of Southwestern Bell.

In 2001, SBC standardized its operating company branding logos, and placed the SBC corporate logo toward the northwest of the name "Southwestern Bell", and the branding for SWBT became SBC Southwestern Bell.

The Southwestern Bell brand vanished in 2002 when SBC dropped the names of all its operating companies to use "SBC" as a national brand. Since d.b.a. names weren't approved before publishing deadlines for telephone directories distributed in December 2002 and January 2003, the Southwestern Bell Telephone Co. name remained on telephone directories issued in December 2002 and January 2003.

After d.b.a names were approved, SBC began to officially use the Southwestern Bell Telephone, L.P. name conjoined with the following titles:
 d/b/a SBC Arkansas
 d/b/a SBC Kansas
 d/b/a SBC Missouri
 d/b/a SBC Oklahoma
 d/b/a SBC Southwest
 d/b/a SBC Texas

SBC Communications bought AT&T Corp. on November 18, 2005, and changed its name to AT&T Inc. Shortly afterwards, on January 15, 2006, AT&T companies were given new d.b.a names. As a result, officially, Southwestern Bell Telephone, L.P. is now joined with the titles:
 d/b/a AT&T Arkansas
 d/b/a AT&T Kansas
 d/b/a AT&T Missouri
 d/b/a AT&T Oklahoma
 d/b/a AT&T Texas
The collective d.b.a. name is now AT&T Southwest.

References

AT&T subsidiaries
Bell System
Telecommunications companies of the United States
Companies based in Dallas
Communications in Arkansas
Communications in Kansas
Communications in Missouri
Communications in Oklahoma
Communications in Texas

Telecommunications companies established in 1882
1882 establishments in Missouri